(born May 13, 1958)  is a Japanese manga artist who is best known for his unusual drawing style. One of his best known manga is What's Michael?, a manga about a curious orange cat and his many adventures that is often compared with Garfield. His earliest work is Grapple Three Brothers, which won the Shōnen magazine New manga artist award.

Works

MangaGrapple Three BrothersSanshirō of 1, 2Judo Bu MonogatariI am MakkoiClub 9GaburinChichonmanchi (Hell of Love & Ecstasy)What's Michael?Stairway to HeavenAnimeJudo Bu Monogatari OAVWhat's Michael? OAVWhat's Michael? 2 OAVWhat's Michael?'' TV

References

External links
 
 A comprehensive guide to Makoto Kobayashi 
 Comiclopedia's page on Makoto Kobayashi

1958 births
Living people
Manga artists from Niigata Prefecture
Winner of Kodansha Manga Award (Shōnen)
Winner of Kodansha Manga Award (General)
People from Niigata (city)